Spilarctia percellens is a moth in the family Erebidae. It was described by Thomas in 1993. It is found in Malaysia.

References

percellens
Moths described in 1993